Hayden Crozier (born 24 December 1993) is a professional Australian rules footballer playing for the Western Bulldogs in the Australian Football League (AFL). He previously played for the Fremantle Football Club from 2012 to 2017.

Career 
Originally from Rowville, Crozier played junior football for the Eastern Ranges in the TAC Cup.  He performed well at the AFL Draft Combine, recording the second highest running leap and elite-level sprinting and endurance results. He represented Victoria Metro at the 2011 AFL Under 18 Championships where he took a spectacular high mark against Western Australia.

He was drafted by Fremantle with their second selection, 20th overall, in the 2011 AFL Draft.

A high leaping left-footed forward, Crozier was selected to play his first games for Fremantle in round 10 of the 2012 AFL season against the Adelaide Football Club after performing well in the West Australian Football League (WAFL) for East Perth.

At the conclusion of the 2017 AFL season, Crozier was traded to the Western Bulldogs.

His father is Sri Lankan.

Statistics
 Statistics are correct to the end of the 2020 season

|-
|- style="background-color: #EAEAEA"
! scope="row" style="text-align:center" | 2012
|style="text-align:center;"|
| 17 || 3 || 0 || 0 || 13 || 17 || 30 || 5 || 3 || 0.0 || 0.0 || 4.3 || 5.7 || 10.0 || 1.7 || 1.0
|-
! scope="row" style="text-align:center" | 2013
|style="text-align:center;"|
| 17 || 9 || 10 || 4 || 75 || 25 || 100 || 33 || 21 || 1.1 || 0.4 || 8.3 || 2.8 || 11.1 || 3.7 || 2.3
|- style="background-color: #EAEAEA"
! scope="row" style="text-align:center" | 2014
|style="text-align:center;"|
| 17 || 11 || 8 || 6 || 77 || 44 || 121 || 33 || 36 || 0.7 || 0.6 || 7.0 || 4.0 || 11.0 || 3.0 || 3.3
|-
! scope="row" style="text-align:center" | 2015
|style="text-align:center;"|
| 17 || 11 || 7 || 3 || 58 || 34 || 92 || 23 || 31 || 0.6 || 0.3 || 5.3 || 3.1 || 8.4 || 2.1 || 2.8
|- style="background-color: #EAEAEA"
! scope="row" style="text-align:center" | 2016
|style="text-align:center;"|
| 17 || 16 || 6 || 6 || 187 || 78 || 265 || 87 || 48 || 0.4 || 0.4 || 11.7 || 4.9 || 16.6 || 5.4 || 3.0
|-
! scope="row" style="text-align:center" | 2017
|style="text-align:center;"|
| 17 || 19 || 13 || 17 || 148 || 92 || 240 || 86 || 74 || 0.7 || 0.9 || 7.8 || 4.8 || 12.6 || 4.5 || 3.9
|- style="background-color: #EAEAEA"
! scope="row" style="text-align:center" | 2018
|style="text-align:center;"|
| 9 || 17 || 1 || 1 || 210 || 104 || 314 || 83 || 47 || 0.1 || 0.1 || 12.4 || 6.1 || 18.5 || 4.9 || 2.8
|-
! scope="row" style="text-align:center" | 2019
|style="text-align:center;"|
| 9 || 22 || 0 || 0 || 257 || 108 || 365 || 136 || 44 || 0.0 || 0.0 || 11.7 || 4.9 || 16.6 || 6.2 || 2.0
|- style="background-color: #EAEAEA"
! scope="row" style="text-align:center" | 2020
|style="text-align:center;"|
| 9 || 15 || 2 || 2 || 154 || 55 || 209 || 59 || 40 || 0.1 || 0.1 || 10.3 || 3.7 || 13.9 || 3.9 || 2.7
|- class="sortbottom"
! colspan=3| Career
! 123
! 47
! 39
! 1179
! 557
! 1736
! 545
! 344
! 0.4
! 0.3
! 9.6
! 4.5
! 14.1
! 4.4
! 2.8
|}

Notes

References

External links

Hayden Crozier's profile on the Official WAFL Website  

1993 births
Living people
Eastern Ranges players
Australian rules footballers from Melbourne
Fremantle Football Club players
Western Bulldogs players
East Perth Football Club players
Peel Thunder Football Club players
Australian people of Sri Lankan descent
People from the City of Knox